Roman roads in Morocco were the western roads of Roman Africa.

Characteristics

In 42 AD  the western part of the kingdom of Mauretania was reorganized as  a province of Rome Mauretania Tingitana. During the reign of emperor Claudius (41–54) infrastructure was improved. 

A road leading in the southern direction from Tingis split in two at Ad Mercuri (possibly modern Bled Mers). 

One of the two followed the Atlantic coast through Iulia Constantia Zilil (Dchar Jdid), Lixus (Larache) and Sala Colonia (near Rabat).

The other, more to the east, ended in Tocolosida, near Volubilis and modern Fez.

There is the possibility that a Roman road was built toward south, from Sala Colonia to Anfa (or Anfus), in the area of modern Casablanca, where there was a small port used by the Phoenicians and later the Romans since 15 BC. This port was used for Roman expeditions toward the Canary islands.

There was another important road that connected Mauretania Tingitana with Mauretania Caesariensis (modern western Algeria). It ran from Tamuda to Numerus Syrorum.

Settlement roads

In ancient Morocco significant roads existed within some of the Roman settlements themselves. 

For example, wide roads paved with large hewn stones are found in the cities of Volubilis and Sala Colonia.

Notes

Sources
 M. Euzennat. 1962. "Les voies romaines du Maroc dans l' Itineraire d' Antonin," Hommages à Albert Grenier (Brussels) vol. II, 595-610.

External links
Diplomatie France (updated map) Les voies antiques du Maroc d’après l’Itinéraire Antonin (retrieved November 17, 2012) 
 Mauretania Tingitana (in Spanish)

See also
Antonine itinerary
Roman roads in Africa
Roman expeditions to Sub-Saharan Africa

Mauretania Tingitana
Roman roads in Africa
Ancient Roman buildings and structures in Morocco
Old roads in Morocco